Wildstorm Productions, (stylized as WildStorm), is an American comic book imprint. Originally founded as an independent company established by Jim Lee under the name "Aegis Entertainment" and expanded in subsequent years by other creators, Wildstorm became a publishing imprint of DC Comics in 1999. Until it was shut down in 2010, the Wildstorm imprint remained editorially separate from DC Comics, with its main studio located in California. The imprint took its name from a portmanteau of the titles of the Jim Lee comic series WildC.A.T.S. and Stormwatch.

Its main fictional universe, the Wildstorm Universe, featured costumed heroes. Wildstorm maintained a number of its core titles from its early period, and continued to publish material expanding its core universe. Its main titles included WildC.A.T.S, Stormwatch, Gen¹³, Wetworks, and The Authority; it also produced single-character-oriented series like Deathblow and Midnighter, and published secondary titles like Welcome to Tranquility.

Wildstorm also published creator-owned material, and licensed properties from other companies, covering a wide variety of genres. Its creator-owned titles included Red Menace, A God Somewhere, and Ex Machina, while its licensed titles included Friday the 13th, A Nightmare on Elm Street, The Texas Chainsaw Massacre, StarCraft, the Dante's Inferno game, The X-Files, and the God of War video game series.

DC shut down the Wildstorm imprint in December 2010. In September 2011, the company relaunched its entire superhero line with a rebooted continuity in an initiative known as The New 52, which included Wildstorm characters incorporated into that continuity with its long-standing DC characters.

In February 2017 Wildstorm was revived with The Wild Storm, by writer Warren Ellis.

History

Image Comics (1992–1997)
Wildstorm, founded by Jim Lee and Brandon Choi, was one of the founding studios that formed Image Comics in 1992. Image grew out of Homage Studios and was founded by artists Whilce Portacio, Jim Lee, Erik Larsen, Rob Liefeld, Todd McFarlane, Marc Silvestri, and Jim Valentino in San Diego, California. All but Portacio decided to become full partners in the new firm. At the time, Lee and Portacio were recognized for their work on various X-Men titles at Marvel Comics.

In late 1992, penciller Marc Silvestri joined the studio to work on the first issue of Cyberforce. Although he worked at the studio, his projects would debut as the work of a new Image "partner studio" firm named Top Cow. Silvestri continued to work out of Wildstorm's studio for about two years. Although WildStorm considered attracting talent, such as John Romita Jr., from the "Big Two", (Marvel and DC), Lee decided to find new talent instead.

Lee's talent search yielded Brett Booth in 1992, and J. Scott Campbell in 1993. Apart from McFarlane's Spawn, Wildstorm produced the most consistently, commercially successful comics from Image. These included Lee's own titles WildC.A.T.s and the teen-hero title Gen¹³, illustrated by J. Scott Campbell. Like many other Image titles, some of the WildStorm titles suffered from inconsistent completion and shipping, resulting in "monthly" comics coming out every few months. This era produced a number of titles of varying popularity including Gen¹³, WildC.A.T.s, Stormwatch, Deathblow, Cybernary, and Whilce Portacio's Wetworks.

In late 1993, Lee launched Wildstorm Productions as a sub-imprint of Image. He explained: "During the startup of Image Comics, I incorporated my business activities under the name Aegis Entertainment. As Aegis grew and the marketplace changed, I decided a new name would more accurately define the nature of the titles we produce". In conjunction with the name change, former DC editor Bill Kaplan was brought in to oversee production and scheduling, in an effort to combat the studio's problems with erratic publication schedules.

His attempts to get the studio's characters into other media proved disappointing. A Saturday morning cartoon series of WildC.A.T.s lasted only a single season (1994–1995), while a full-length animated version of Gen¹³ was produced but never released in the United States. Disney had acquired the domestic distribution rights, but shelved the product. Paramount had international distribution rights, and later released the film only in a few foreign markets. Toys from both titles were less successful than those made by Todd McFarlane, partly due to poor marketing and partly because the McFarlane toys were targeted at a more mature audience. However, they had a big success copying Wizards of the Coast's Magic: The Gathering with their introduction of the card game, Wildstorms: The Expandable Super-Hero Card Game produced between 1995 - 1997, which was later spun off into a crossover set of cards with Marvel. The crossover was the swan song for the Wildstorm game as Marvel's merchandising clout succeeded in pushing Wildstorm's out of the spotlight. Although the timing was right for their card game, they were too early by a year with a Pog game which used the WildC.A.T.s characters they released in 1993.

In 1995, Wildstorm created an imprint called Homage Comics, centered on more writer-driven books. The imprint started with Kurt Busiek's Astro City and The Wizard's Tale, James Robinson's Leave It to Chance (with Paul Smith), and Terry Moore's Strangers In Paradise. Subsequently, the imprint featured works by Sam Kieth, including The Maxx, Zero Girl and Four Women, three of Warren Ellis' pop-comics mini-series, Mek, Red, and Reload, and Jeff Mariotte's weird western Desperadoes.

In 1997, Cliffhanger debuted a line of creator-owned comic books which included such popular works as: J. Scott Campbell's Danger Girl, Joe Madureira's Battle Chasers, Humberto Ramos' Crimson and Out There, Joe Kelly and Chris Bachalo's Steampunk, Kurt Busiek and Carlos Pacheco's Arrowsmith, Busiek's Astro City and Warren Ellis's Two-Step and Tokyo Storm Warning.

1997 also saw a revamp of all the Wildstorm Universe titles, including comic-books by writers such as: Alan Moore, Warren Ellis, Adam Warren, Sean Phillips, and Joe Casey. After this revamp the new Wildcats series, Stormwatch and DV8 took the places of the most popular and most commercially successful comics of the Wildstorm Universe. Wildstorm also made a presentation to Lucasfilm Ltd. in an attempt to obtain a license for the lucrative Star Wars license, but lost to the incumbent Dark Horse Comics.

DC Comics first run (1998–2010)

Due to declining sales across the U.S. comics industry, and his view that his role as publisher and growing family demands interfered with his role as an artist, Lee left Image Comics and sold WildStorm to DC Comics in late 1998, enabling him to focus once again on art. The deal went into effect in January 1999.  DC hailed the decision as one that would "strengthen both WildStorm's ability to expand its editorial goals and diversifying DC's output". WildStorm was editorially separate from DC Comics, and the two companies maintained offices on opposite coasts: Wildstorm in California, and DC in New York City. DC's acquisition of WildStorm allowed their respective universes to co-exist, and characters from either universe could appear in the titles of either imprint.

In 1999, WildStorm launched several new titles, including The Authority, a dark and violent superhero comic whose characters fought dirty and had little regard for the rights and lives of their opponents; their only goal was to make the world a better place. Warren Ellis created The Authority as a successor to Stormwatch. He wrote its first twelve issues before handing the series over to Mark Millar. The Authority fused Silver Age superhero concepts with 1990s cynicism. In the 2004 Wildstorm crossover, Coup d'etat, the Authority takes control of the United States. Ellis and artist John Cassaday created Planetary, about "explorers of the strange", an experiment that merged pop culture, comic book history and literary characters.

WildStorm launched a new imprint titled America's Best Comics as a showcase for Alan Moore. The line includes the titles Promethea, The League of Extraordinary Gentlemen, Tomorrow Stories, Tom Strong and Top 10.

The studio launched Eye of the Storm in 2001 as an experiment. By this time, WildStorm had become largely a "mature readers" imprint. Joe Casey continued writing Wildcats, retitling it Wildcats 3.0 to reflect the shift in tone. The new version was penciled by Dustin Nguyen with inks by Richard Friend. Gen¹³ was relaunched with a new first issue, written by X-Men's Chris Claremont. A Gen¹³ spinoff, 21 Down, was written by Jimmy Palmiotti and Justin Gray. After the Point Blank mini-series, Ed Brubaker developed the same themes into the critically acclaimed Sleeper, set in the WildStorm universe.

In 2001 Warren Ellis began Global Frequency. The rights for Global Frequency were bought by Warner Bros. in 2004 and a pilot for a TV series for the WB Network was made. The pilot never aired and was not picked up as a series, although the pilot was later leaked on the internet. Stormwatch was relaunched as Stormwatch: Team Achilles, about a team of normal soldiers who combat rogue superheroes.

Robbie Morrison wrote a one-shot featuring the Authority characters, titled "Scorched Earth" (2003). It was serialized as a back-up story in the Eye of the Storm titles. A new ongoing Authority series began the storyline of the Coup d'état crossover, which ran through Authority, Sleeper, Stormwatch: Team Achilles and Wildcats 3.0.

Two Winter Special anthologies also came out. Most of the line, except Sleeper, were canceled two years after their introduction.

In 2004, WildStorm revamped its array of sub-imprints. The core titles were grouped into the "WildStorm Universe" imprint, the creator-owned properties became the "WildStorm Signature Series" imprint, and all the licensed properties remained under the "WildStorm" imprint.

Following Eye of the Storm, WildStorm published fewer WildStorm Universe titles, including Majestic and Wildcats: Nemesis; Majestic was based on a character that had appeared in DC Comics Superman titles. In August 2006, WildStorm simplified its "brand" by returning all content to a single WildStorm imprint, and discarding the "Universe" and "Signature Series" imprints. In 2007, the WildStorm fictional universe became "Earth-50", part of the DC Comics Multiverse.

In April 2008, Ben Abernathy announced that the events of Wildstorm: Revelations, Wildstorm: Armageddon and Number of the Beast would segue into Wildstorm: World's End, a post-apocalyptic direction for the line. In July of the same year, Christos Gage and Neil Googe published a new WildCats: World's End #1. There followed, in August 2008, a new Authority: World's End #1 by Dan Abnett and Andy Lanning with art by Simon Coleby, Gen¹³ #21 by Scott Beatty with art by Mike Huddleson, and Stormwatch: PHD #13 by Ian Edginton with art by Leandro Fernández and Francisco Paronzini. 

That same year, DC releaseld the crossover limited series DC/Wildstorm: DreamWar one of the earliest times where DC and WildStorm characters would appear together. The six-issue comic book limited series was written by Keith Giffen, drawn by Lee Garbett, and published by DC Comics.

The Stormwatch: PHD title ended in November 2009. The remaining series each received another creative-team shake-up as 2010 began: February's The Authority #18 by Marc Bernardin and Adam Freeman with art by Al Barrionuevo, Wildcats #19 by Adam Beechen with art by Tim Seeley and Ryan Winn, and April's Gen¹³ #35 by Phil Hester and art by Cruddie Torian.

WildStorm varied its publishing with licensed properties, such as: A Nightmare on Elm Street, Friday the 13th, The Texas Chainsaw Massacre, Mirror's Edge, World of Warcraft, The X-Files, Dante's Inferno, and God of War. WildStorm has also published original graphic novels from writers Kevin J. Anderson, John Ridley and David Brin.

The imprint was shut down in December 2010, with Wildcats (vol. 5) #30 as its last issue, although DC Comics announced that the characters would reappear some time in the future.

DC Comics relaunched its DC Universe imprint in September 2011, which included the integration of the WildStorm characters into the DC Universe. The initial wave of relaunched titles included: Voodoo and Grifter solo series, a revived Stormwatch title featuring Jack Hawksmoor, Midnighter, Apollo, the Engineer, and Jenny Quantum, and a revived version of Team 7 with non-WildStorm characters Deathstroke, Amanda Waller and Black Canary. The Teen Titans spin-off title The Ravagers featured Caitlin Fairchild and Warblade as part of the cast, while WildC.A.T.s villain Helspont appeared in Superman #7 and #8, Grunge appeared in Superboy #8, Zealot appeared in Deathstroke #9, and Spartan appeared in Team 7 #5.  Midnighter was a recurring character in Grayson, before spinning off into his own ongoing series. Midnighter and Apollo also appeared in a 6-issue miniseries, Midnighter and Apollo.

DC Comics revival (2017–present)
On February 16, 2017, Wildstorm was officially revived with The Wild Storm #1 by Warren Ellis and Jon Davis-Hunt, a 24 issue series that re-imagined the Wildstorm Universe. On October 11, 2017, Wildstorm launched a second series under The Wild Storm banner with the 12 issue mini-series The Wild Storm: Michael Cray by Bryan Hill. Following the conclusion of The Wild Storm DC Comics announced that a new Wildcats six issue mini-series was to debut August 28, 2019, again penned by Ellis with art by Ramon Villalobos, but has been cancelled in 2019, with a future possibility of a release.

Titles

Major WildStorm Universe
 WildC.A.T.s
 Stormwatch
 The Authority
 Wetworks
 Gen¹³
 Dv8
 Team 7

Creator-owned titles

Ex Machina by Brian K. Vaughan
Astro City by Kurt Busiek
The Wizard's Tale by Kurt Busiek
Arrowsmith by Kurt Busiek and Carlos Pacheco
America's Best Comics by Alan Moore
Danger Girl by Andy Hartnell and J. Scott Campbell
Battle Chasers by Joe Madureira
Crimson by Humberto Ramos
Out There by Humberto Ramos
Steampunk by Chris Bachalo and Joe Kelly 
Red Menace by Danny Bilson, Paul DeMeo, Adam Brody and Jerry Ordway
A god Somewhere by John Arcudi and Peter Snejbjerg
Leave It to Chance by James Robinson and Paul Smith
Strangers in Paradise by Terry Moore
The Maxx by Sam Kieth
The Boys by Garth Ennis and Darick Robertson
Zero Girl by Sam Kieth
Four Women by Sam Kieth
Mek by Warren Ellis
Red by Warren Ellis
Reload by Warren Ellis
Two-Step by Warren Ellis
Tokyo Storm Warning by Warren Ellis
Desperadoes by Jeff Mariotte

Licensed titles
Friday the 13th
A Nightmare on Elm Street
The Texas Chainsaw Massacre
World of Warcraft
StarCraft
Resident Evil
Dante's Inferno
The X-Files
God of War #1-5; #6 was published by DC Comics due to WildStorm's closure at that time.
Modern Warfare 2: Ghost
  Gears of War (comics) #1-14; #15-24 were published by DC.
Star Trek: A series of limited series and one-shots, published by DC 1999-2002.

See also
 List of WildStorm titles
 List of WildStorm reprint collections

References

External links
 Wildstorm general search at the Grand Comics Database
 
 
 Wildstorm at the Big Comic Book DataBase
 Wild at Heart: Ben Abernathy, Newsarama, May 19, 2008

 
Comic book publishing companies of the United States
DC Comics imprints
Horror comics
La Jolla, San Diego
Companies based in San Diego
Publishing companies established in 1992
Mass media companies disestablished in 2010
1992 establishments in California
2010 disestablishments in California
Defunct companies based in California